Dimitrios Katsimitros (born 12 June 1997) is a Greek professional footballer who plays as a goalkeeper for Super League 2 club Chania.

Career
Katsimitros began his football career at the infrastructure segments of Olympiacos, featuring in the 2015–16 UEFA Youth League, where he played in two matches vs. Bayern Munich and Arsenal during the competition group stage, managing to keep a clean sheet in both occasions. In the summer of 2016 he signed a contract with Cypriot First Division club Anorthosis, without however making an appearance for the club during a one-year stay. As such, in September 2017 he returned to Greece and signed a contract with Second Division club Ergotelis.

During the first half of the 2017–18 season, Katsimitros was intended as a back-up goalkeeper behind teammate Panagiotis Ladas, but eventually earned a spot in the starting lineup for the remainder of the season, after saving a penalty and keeping a clean sheet during a match against Kallithea, coming in as a substitute for Ladas, who was sent-off for tackling an opponent inside the penalty area.

Katsimitros again fought for a place in Ergotelis' starting lineup the following season, after the arrival of more experienced goalkeeper Manolis Kalogerakis, but eventually came out on top yet again. On 24 January 2019, Katsimitros almost single-handedly earned his club a historic promotion to the 2018–19 Greek Cup quarterfinals, after saving three penalties in the second leg of the Round of 16 match-up vs. fellow Cretan Superleague rival OFI (one of the total three awarded to OFI during the match, and two more during the eventual penalty shoot-out).

Career statistics

References

External links

1997 births
Living people
Greek footballers
Greek expatriate footballers
Football League (Greece) players
Olympiacos F.C. players
Anorthosis Famagusta F.C. players
Ergotelis F.C. players
Association football goalkeepers
Footballers from Volos